Poropuntius bantamensis is a species of ray-finned fish in the genus Poropuntius which is known with certainty only from the upper Chao Phraya basin in Thailand.

References 

bantamensis
Fish described in 1920